Lichinga is the capital city of Niassa Province of Mozambique. The town was founded as Vila Cabral as a farming and military settlement. It is served by Lichinga Airport. The province borders Ruvuma Region in Tanzania.

History

Early History
The region that is Niassa province is the ancestral homeland of the Yao and Makua.

Portuguese rule
Founded by the Portuguese colonial administration in 1931 as Vila Cabral, the town was designed to become a fast growth urban centre, its streets and avenues paying attention to a projected future growth. Vila Cabral was upgraded to city status in 1962. In the early 1960s its population was 27,000 inhabitants; by 1970 it had 36,715. The city developed as an agriculture and colonial service centre until the independence of Mozambique from Portugal in 1975. In addition, the town's economy included forestry-based activities and was surrounded by a pine tree plantation, of which most has been felled in recent years.

After independence from Portugal
After independence the new government renamed the city Lichinga. The effects of 17 years of civil war (1975-1992) spread famine and disease in Mozambique resulting in many deaths and refugees in the region around Lichinga.

Climate
Summertime is October to April with the hottest weather in November: average temperature . This is also the season of heavy rain especially December to March.

Demographics
There are a minimum estimated 450,000 Yao people living in Mozambique. They largely occupy the eastern and northern part of the Niassa province and form about 40% of the population of Lichinga.

Transport

A railway branch line from the port of Nacala terminates in this town, it has been renovated and receives services 3 times per week. Transport into and out of the city is either by private car or the public chapa, or minibus system. Air service is provided by Lichinga Airport with flights to Nampula and Maputo through LAM Mozambique Airlines or Ethiopian Airlines.

References 

Populated places in Niassa Province
Provincial capitals in Mozambique
Populated places established in 1931
Lichinga District